Barney Simon (13 April 1932 – 30 June 1995, Johannesburg) was a South African writer, playwright and director.

Early life 
The son of working-class Lithuanian Jewish immigrants, Simon discovered a love of theatre while working under director Joan Littlewood in London in the 1950s. Returning to Johannesburg, he supported himself as an advertising copywriter while producing and directing plays. Before he opened the Market, he staged multi-racial plays anywhere he could: in warehouses and shantytowns, storefronts and back yards, including Athol Fugard's The Blood Knot (1961). Simon spent a year (1969–70) in New York City, where he introduced South African plays to an American audience and edited the journal New American Review.

Simon and the Market Theatre 
In 1976 Barney Simon co-founded Johannesburg’s Market Theatre, South Africa's first multiracial cultural center and a birthplace of the country’s indigenous theater movement. Working under the racial segregation laws of apartheid without state subsidies and under constant threat of arrest for staging controversial contemporary plays performed by multiracial casts in front of multiracial audiences, Simon remained the theater’s artistic director from its opening until he died. He was the first to stage many of Athol Fugard’s plays, directed a film for the BBC of Nadine Gordimer’s story "City Lovers", and worked with screenwriter Jean-Claude Carrière on the French translation for the Paris production by Peter Brook of Simon's last play, The Suit (Le Costume) (1994), adapted from a short story of the same name by Can Themba.

Simon was known for his method of creating and developing original plays through a workshop process of field research, improvisation and collaborative writing, sometimes with untrained actors or combinations of musicians, professional actors and people entirely new to the theater.

Literary life 
Simon was active in South African literature as the editor from 1964 to 1971 of The Classic, the influential South African journal of township literature founded by Nat Nakasa in 1963. Simon edited an autobiographical novel by Dugmore Boetie, Familiarity is the Kingdom of the Lost (London: Barrie & Jenkins, 1969), for which Simon also wrote an afterword. He also published a collection of his own stories, Joburg Sis!, in 1974.

Publications

Selected plays 

Phiri (1972)
Hey Listen (1973)
People  (1973)
People Too (1974)
Storytime (1975)
Cincinnati (1979)
Cold Stone Jug (1980)
Call Me Woman (1980)
Marico Moonshine and Manpower (1981)
Woza Albert! (1981)
Black Dog-Inj Mayama (1984)
Born in the RSA (1985)
Outers (1985)
Klaaglied vir Kous (1986)
Inyanga - about Women in Africa (1989)
Eden and Other Places  (1989)
Score me the Ages (1989)
Starbrites (1990)
Singing The Times (1992)
Silent Movie (1993)
The Lion and the Lamb (1993)
The Suit (1994)

Sources
A Singing in Every Moment and Inch of Me: The Letters of Barney Simon to Lionel Abraham (2009), Seven Stories Press. 
The World In An Orange: Making Theatre with Barney Simon (2006), edited by Leila Henriques and Irene Stephanou, Seven Stories Press. 
Woza Afrika! - An Anthology of South African Plays (1986), George Braziller. 
Born in the RSA (1997), Wits University Press. 
Joburg, Sis! (1974), Bateleur.

References

External links

South African writers
1932 births
1995 deaths
South African dramatists and playwrights